Celastrina echo, known generally as the echo azure or western azure, is a species of blue in the butterfly family Lycaenidae.

The MONA or Hodges number for Celastrina echo is 4363.2.

Subspecies
These four subspecies belong to the species Celastrina echo:
 Celastrina echo cinerea (W. H. Edwards, 1883) (southwestern azure)
 Celastrina echo echo (W. H. Edwards, 1864) (Pacific azure)
 Celastrina echo nigrescens (J. Fletcher, 1903) (northwestern azure)
 Celastrina echo sidara (Clench, 1944) (Rocky Mountain azure)

References

Further reading

External links

 

Celastrina
Articles created by Qbugbot
Butterflies described in 1864